Frank E. Millard    (July 4, 1865 – July 4, 1892) was a Major League Baseball player. He played second base in one game for  the St. Louis Brows of the American Association on May 4, 1890. He died two years later, while playing for the Galveston Sand Crabs in the Texas League.

Sources

Major League Baseball second basemen
St. Louis Browns (AA) players
Baseball players from Illinois
1865 births
1892 deaths
19th-century baseball players
Galveston Sand Crabs players
Sportspeople from East St. Louis, Illinois